Te Mata (Māori for "The Eye" or "The Blade") is the name of several places in New Zealand:

Te Mata, Thames-Coromandel District, Waikato
Te Mata, Waikato District, Waikato
Te Mata Peak, Hawke's Bay
Te Mata Estate, a winery based in Hawke's Bay
Te Mata River
Te Mata Hapuku, the original name of Birdlings Flat, Canterbury
Te Mata Stream, an alternative name for a stretch of the Opotoru River
Te Mata, a hill overlooking the Whakapara River, Northland
Te Mata, a hill near Linton, Manawatu-Wanganui
Te Mata, a hill within Whanganui National Park, Manawatu-Wanganui
New Zealand Poet Laureate, originally known for sponsorship purposes as the Te Mata Poet Laureate

See also
Karl Temata, Cook Islands rugby league player